The Soldiers Delight Natural Environmental Area is located in western Baltimore County, Maryland. Much of the area of the Soldiers Delight NEA, which totals  of protected land, contains a serpentine barren that contains a number of rare and endangered species of plants.

The following list of woody plants comes from the publications by [F] Fleming et al. 1995, [M] Monteferrante 1973, [R] Reed 1984, [We] Wennerstrom 1995, [Wood] Wood 1984, and the unpublished data by [Wo] Worthley 1955-1985, with authors' acronyms used below.

List of woody plants of the Soldiers Delight Natural Environmental Area

Division Pinophyta (Gymnosperms)
Cupressaceae - (Cypress Family)
Juniperus virginiana  - Eastern redcedar [M, We]

Pinaceae - (Pine Family)
Pinus pungens  - Table mountain pine [We]
Pinus rigida  - Pitch pine [We]
Pinus virginiana  - Virginia pine [M, We, Wo]
Tsuga canadensis  - Eastern hemlock [We]

Division Magnoliophyta (Angiosperms)
Class Magnoliopsida (Dicotyledons)

Aceraceae - (Maple Family)
Acer negundo  - Boxelder [We, Wo]
Acer platanoides  - Norway maple [We]
Acer rubrum  - Red maple [M, We, Wo]

Anacardiaceae - (Cashew Family)
Rhus glabra  - Smooth sumac [M]
Rhus typhina  - Staghorn sumac [M, We]
Toxicodendron radicans  - Poison ivy [M, We, Wo]

Berberidaceae - (Barberry Family)
Berberis canadensis Miller - American Barberry [R] [G3, SH, X]
Berberis thunbergii DC. - Japanese Barberry [EU]
Berberis vulgaris L. - Common or European Barberry [We]

Betulaceae - (Birch Family)
Alnus serrulata (Aiton) Willd. - Smooth Alder [Wo]
Alnus viridis (Villars) Lam. - Green or Mountain Alder [M]
Betula lenta L. - Sweet or Black Birch [Wo]
Betula nigra L. - River Birch [We, Wo]
Betula populifolia Marshall - Gray Birch [Wo]
Carpinus caroliniana Walter - American Hornbeam [Wo]
Corylus americana Marsh. - American Hazelnut [Wo]

Caprifoliaceae - (Honeysuckle Family)
Lonicera × bella Zabel - Hybrid Honeysuckle [M]
Lonicera japonica Thunb. - Japanese Honeysuckle [M]
Viburnum dentatum var. lucidum Aiton - Arrow-wood [M, R]
Viburnum acerifolium L. - Maple-leaf Viburnum [We]

Celastraceae - (Staff-tree Family)
Celastrus orbiculatus Thunb. - Oriental Bittersweet [EU]
Celastrus scandens L. - American Bittersweet [We]

Cornaceae - (Dogwood Family)
Cornus florida L. - Flowering Dogwood [M, We]
Nyssa sylvatica Marsh. - Blackgum, Black Tupelo [We, Wood]

Ebenaceae - (Ebony Family)
Diospyros virginiana L. - Persimmon [We]

Elaeagnaceae - (Oleaster Family)
Elaeagnus umbellata Thunb. - Autumn Olive [We]

Ericaceae - (Heath Family)
Chimaphila maculata (L.) Pursh. - Spotted Wintergreen [M, R, We]
Chimaphila umbellata (L.) Barton - Pipsissewa [M, R, We]
Epigaea repens L. - Trailing Arbutus [We]
Gaultheria procumbens L. - Wintergreen [Wood]
Gaylussacia baccata (Wang.) K.Koch - Black Huckleberry [M, We, Wo]
Gaylussacia dumosa (Andr.) T. & G. - Dwarf Huckleberry [Wood]
Kalmia latifolia L. - Mountain Laurel [M, We, Wo]
Vaccinium stamineum L. - Dewberry [M, We, Wo]
Vaccinium vacillans Torrey - Low Blueberry [M]
Fabaceae - (Legume Family)
Cercis canadensis L. - Redbud [We]
Robinia pseudoacacia L. - Black Locust [M, We, Wo]
Fagaceae - (Beech Family)
Castanea dentata (Marshall) Borkh. - American Chestnut [We, Wo] [G4, S2]
Castanea mollissima Blume - Chinese Chestnut [We]
Castanea pumila (L.) Miller - Chinquapin [We, Wo]
Quercus alba L. - White Oak [Wood, Wo]
Quercus ilicifolia Wang. - Bear Oak [We, Wo]
Quercus marilandica Muenchh. - Blackjack Oak [M]
Quercus montana Willd. - Chestnut oak [We, Wo]
Quercus prinoides Willd. - Chinquapin Oak [M]
Quercus rubra L. - Northern Red Oak [We]
Quercus stellata Wang. - Post Oak [M, Wo]
Quercus velutina Lam. - black oak  [M, Wo]
Quercus x bushii Sarg. - Oak [M]

Hamamelidaceae - (Witch-hazel Family)
Hamamelis virginiana L. - Witch-hazel [We]

Juglandaceae - (Walnut Family)
Carya cordiformis (Wangenh.) K. Koch - Bitternut Hickory [We]
Carya glabra (Miller) Sweet - Pignut Hickory [Wo]
Carya tomentosa (Lam.) Nutt. - Mockernut Hickory [We, Wood, Wo]
Juglans nigra L. - Black Walnut [We, Wo]
Lauraceae - (Laurel Family)
Lindera benzoin Blume - Spicebush [M, R, We]
Sassafras albidum (Nutt.) Nees - Sassafras [M, R, We, Wo]
Magnoliaceae - (Magnolia Family)
Liriodendron tulipifera L. - Tulip Tree, Yellow poplar [We, Wo]
Platanaceae - (Plane-tree Family)
Platanus occidentalis L. - American Sycamore [We]

Rosaceae - (Rose Family)
Amelanchier arborea (Michx.) Fern. - Downy Serviceberry [M, We]
Physocarpus opulifolius (L.) Maxim. - Ninebark [R]
Prunus cerasus L. - Sour Cherry [We]
Prunus pumila L. - Sand Cherry [M]
Prunus pumila var. cuneata (Raf.) L.H. Bailey - Eastern Dwarf Cherry [We] {G5, SU}
Prunus serotina Ehrh. - black cherry [M, We, Wo]
Pyrus malus L. - Apple [M, We]
Rosa carolina L. - Pasture Rose [We]
Rosa multiflora Thunb. - Multiflora Rose [We]
Rosa virginiana Miller - Virginia Rose [M, We]
Rubus allegheniensis T.C. Porter - Common Blackberry [R]
Rubus argutus Link. - Tall blackberry [M]
Rubus cuneifolius Pursh - Sand Blackberry [Wood]
Rubus flagellaris Willd. - Common or Northern dewberry [M, R]
Rubus hispidus L. - Swamp Dewberry [M]
Rubus idaeus L. - Red Raspberry [M]
Rubus phoenicolasius Maxim. - Wineberry [We]
Spiraea alba Du Roi - Narrow-leaved meadow-sweet [M]

Salicaceae - (Willow Family)
Populus deltoides Marsh. - Eastern cottonwood [Wood]
Populus grandidentata Michx. - Large-toothed aspen [We, Wo]
Populus tremuloides Michx. - Quaking Aspen [We]
Salix nigra Marshall - Black Willow [Wo]
Salix serissima (L.H. Bailey) Fern. - Autumn Willow [Wo]
Salix occidentalis Walter - Dwarf prairie willow [R, We, Wo]

Simaroubaceae - (Quassia Family)
Ailanthus altissima (Mill.) Swingle - Tree-of-heaven [Wo]

Vitaceae - (Grape Family)
Parthenocissus quinquefolia (L.) Planch. - Virginia Creeper [M, R, We]
Vitis rotundifolia Michx. - Muscadines [M]

Class Liliopsida (Monocotyledons)

Smilacaceae - (Greenbrier Family)
Smilax glauca Walt. - Glaucous Greenbrier [M, R, We, Wo]
Smilax hispida Muhl. - Bristly Greenbrier [Wo]
Smilax rotundifolia L. - Common Greenbrier  [M, R, We, Wo]

See also
Soldiers Delight Natural Environmental Area
Ferns and fern allies of Soldiers Delight
Graminoids of Soldiers Delight
Lichens of Soldiers Delight
Wildflowers of Soldiers Delight
Maryland
Lichens of Maryland
Natural Environment Area (Maryland)

References

Ongoing Survey List of Plants of Soldier's Delight.
Brown, Russell G., and Melvin L. Brown. 1972.  Woody Plants of Maryland. Port City Press, Baltimore, Maryland, 347 pages.
Davis, Charles A. 2004. List of Plants of Soldier's Delight. (Unpublished).
[F]   Fleming, Cristol, Marion B. Lobstein. 1995. Finding Wildflowers in the Washington-Baltimore Area. The Johns Hopkins University Press, Baltimore and London, 312 pages.
Gleason, Henry A., and Arthur Cronquist. 1991. Manual of Vascular Plants of Northeastern United States and Adjacent Canada. (Second Edition) The New York Botanical Garden, Bronx, New York 10458, 910 pages.
Google Hybrid Map. 2006. Target building, Soldiers Delight Visitor Center. 
Holmgren, Noel H. 1998. Illustrated Companion to Gleason and Cronquist's Manual. Illustrations of the Vascular Plants of Northeastern U. S. and Adjacent Canada. The New York Botanical Garden, Bronx, New York 10458, 937 pages.
Maryland Department of Natural Resources. 2003. Explanation of Rank and Status Codes. 
Maryland Department of Natural Resources. 2004. Current and Historical Rare, Threatened, and Endangered Species of Baltimore County, Maryland. 
[M]   Monteferrante, Frank. 1973. A Phytosociological Study of Soldiers Delight, Baltimore County, Maryland. Towson State College, Towson, Maryland.
[R]   Reed, Clyde F. 1984. Floras of the Serpentinite Formations in Eastern North America, with descriptions of geomorphology and mineralogy of the formations. Reed Herbarium, Baltimore, Maryland.
[We]   Wennerstrom, Jack. 1995. Soldiers Delight Journal - Exploring a Globally Rare Ecosystem. University of Pittsburgh Press, Pittsburg and London, 247 pages.
[Wo]   Worthley, Elmer G. (1955-1985) List of Plants of Soldier's Delight. Unpublished.
[Wood]   Wood, Sarah G. 1984. Mineral Element Composition of Forest Communities and Soils at Soldiers Delight, Maryland. Towson State University, Towson, Marland.

External links
Maryland Dept. Natural Resources — "Guide to the Soldiers Delight Natural Environmental Area"
Ongoing Survey List of Plants of Soldier's Delight

Soldiers Delight
.Soldiers Delight
Soldiers Delight related